This was the first edition of the tournament.

Zhang Ze won the title after defeating Vasek Pospisil 7–5, 3–6, 6–2 in the final.

Seeds

Draw

Finals

Top half

Bottom half

References
Main Draw
Qualifying Draw

Kunal Patel San Francisco Open - Singles
2017 in San Francisco